The Bay neighborhood is located in Springfield, Massachusetts. It covers 556.5 acres of land, making it one of the city's smallest neighborhoods.

Neighborhood 
Its housing stock features Victorian architecture and brick apartment buildings.

The neighborhood contains Central High School and a portion of American International College.

Demographics 
In 2009 Bay was home to 4,500 residents.

References

Neighborhoods in Springfield, Massachusetts